Turkey participated in the Turkvision Song Contest 2014 in Kazan, Tatarstan, Russia. Turkish broadcaster TRT Avaz was responsible for the country's participation in the contest. The song qualified from the semi-final and placed 15th (last) in the final.

Background 

Prior to the 2014 contest, Turkey had hosted and competed in the inaugural Turkvision Song Contest 2013 in Eskişehir. Turkey was represented by the song "Sen, Ben, Biz" performed by Manevra. The song placed 6th in the final with 187 points.

Before Turkvision 

Turkey's participation in the contest was confirmed in July 2014, with TRT Avaz as the participating broadcaster. TRT Avaz internally selected both their artist and song. Funda Kılıç was announced as the Turkish artist in October 2014, and the song "Hoppa" was announced as the Turkish entry in November 2014.

Artist and song information

Funda Kılıç 

Funda Kılıç (born 1988) is a Belgian-Turkish singer who represented Turkey in the Turkvision Song Contest 2014. She was raised in Antwerp, Belgium from the age of six months. She is fluent in Turkish, English and Dutch, and speaks French and German.

Discography

Hoppa 

"Hoppa" is a song recorded by Turkish singer , written by Sinan Akçıl. The song represented Turkey in the Turkvision Song Contest 2014.

At Turkvision 

Turkey performed 15th in the semi-final on 19 November 2014, and placed second in a field of 25 countries with 199 points, thus qualifying for the final. Following the semi-final, it was reported that  had come under criticism from a number of delegations for performing in shorts. The head of delegation for Bashkortostan stated that it was outrageous for Kılıç to be wearing the shorts in front of 300 million viewers. Kılıç did however have the support of the contest organisers.

Turkey performed 1st in the final on 21 November 2014, placing 15th (last) with 128 points. It was suggested by Eurovoix that Turkey's last-place result in the final was due to Turkish jury member Sinan Akçıl giving many regions a low score in the semi-final, which was reciprocated by those regions' jurors in the final. Akçıl stated that he believed this was out of "revenge", and that he did not know the voting was made public, but "would give the same votes even if [he] knew."

Points awarded to Turkey

Points awarded by Turkey

References 

2014
Countries in the Turkvision Song Contest 2014
Turkvision